Rinke is a surname. Notable people with the surname include:

 Barbara Rinke (born 1947), German politician
 Carl J. Rinke (1902–1978), American businessman and politician
 Carmen Rinke (born 1953), Canadian boxer
 Christopher Rinke (born 1960), Canadian wrestler
 Jens Rinke (born 1990), Danish footballer
 Piet Rinke (born 1981), Zimbabwean cricketer

See also
 Rinka (disambiguation)
 Rinker
 Rinke Khanna (born 1977), Indian actress